At least three ships of the French Navy have borne the name Épervier:

 , an  launched in 1802 and captured by the Royal Navy in 1802
 , a  launched in 1886 and stricken in 1911
 , an  launched in 1931 and sunk in 1942

French Navy ship names